, provisional designation: , is a Jupiter trojan from the Greek camp, approximately  in diameter. It was discovered on 21 November 2000, by astronomers with the Lincoln Near-Earth Asteroid Research at the Lincoln Lab's ETS near Socorro, New Mexico, in the United States. The dark Jovian asteroid belongs to the largest Jupiter trojans and has a rotation period of 7.84 hours. It has not been named since its numbering in February 2001.

Orbit and classification 

 is a dark Jovian asteroid in a 1:1 orbital resonance with Jupiter. It is located in the leading Greek camp at the Gas Giant's  Lagrangian point, 60° ahead of its orbit . It is also a non-family asteroid in the Jovian background population. It orbits the Sun at a distance of 4.9–5.4 AU once every 11 years and 9 months (4,280 days; semi-major axis of 5.16 AU). Its orbit has an eccentricity of 0.05 and an inclination of 21° with respect to the ecliptic.

Numbering and naming 

This minor planet was numbered by the Minor Planet Center on 8 February 2001. , it has not been named.

Physical characteristics 

 is an assumed, carbonaceous C-type asteroid. Most Jupiter trojans are D-types, with the reminder being mostly C and P-type asteroids. It has a high V–I color index of 1.090.

Rotation period 

Lightcurve analysis gave a rotation period of  hours with a brightness amplitude of 0.20 magnitude.

Diameter and albedo 

According to the surveys carried out by the NEOWISE mission of NASA's Wide-field Infrared Survey Explorer and the Japanese Akari satellite,  measures 48.19 and 50.37 kilometers in diameter and its surface has an albedo of 0.063 and 0.076, respectively. The Collaborative Asteroid Lightcurve Link assumes a standard albedo for a carbonaceous asteroid of 0.057 and calculates a diameter of 50.77 kilometers based on an absolute magnitude of 10.2.

References

External links 
 Asteroid Lightcurve Database (LCDB), query form (info )
 Asteroids and comets rotation curves, CdR – Observatoire de Genève, Raoul Behrend
 Discovery Circumstances: Numbered Minor Planets (20001)-(25000) – Minor Planet Center
 Asteroid (22149) 2000 WD49 at the Small Bodies Data Ferret
 
 

022149
022149
20001121